Deh Tushmal (also Romanized as Deh Tūshmāl) is a village in Darreh Seydi Rural District, in the Central District of Borujerd County, Lorestan Province, Iran. At the 2006 census, its population was 93, in 22 families.

References 

Towns and villages in Borujerd County